Ngaio Marsh Theatre was a 1977 television miniseries which adapted four of the author's Inspector Roderick Alleyn detective novels for New Zealand television. The British actor George Baker starred in the title role.

The series adapted three Alleyn novels that were set in New Zealand (Vintage Murder, Colour Scheme, and Died in the Wool) along with the London-set Opening Night. The last mentioned featured a major character from New Zealand coming to England to work in the theatre. The series was originally screened on Television New Zealand. A later broadcast on PBS in the United States was the first American screening of a New Zealand television drama.

Cast 
George Baker as Roderick Alleyn

Local actors who appeared in the series included Terence Cooper, Don Selwyn and Ian Watkin.

References

New Zealand television miniseries
New Zealand drama television series
1977 New Zealand television series debuts
1970s New Zealand television series
TVNZ 1 original programming
1977 New Zealand television series endings
1977 in New Zealand television
1970s television miniseries